Akinloye Tofowomo popularly known as Akiin Shuga (born January 6, 1975) is a Nigerian singer, songwriter and musicpreneur. Akinloye Tofowomo is best known as the founder and lead singer of the popular Nigerian live band Shuga band, that was formed in 1998. Akinloye Tofowomo is also the founder Shuga Limb Foundation, a foundation that cares for people suffering from polio.

Life
He is married to Maria Tofowomo with  children.
He was born in Ondo state to late Justice Tofowomo, of the Federal High Court, and Akin had his formative years in the eastern part of the country; Enugu and Calabar. His desire to run a well-structured music business led him to study music business at Berklee College of Music, Boston, Massachusetts.
At age five, he  suffered from polio and was able to pull through, with the enormous support and encouragement from his father who did not give any room for self-pity or pity from others.
Akiin Shuga started the Shuga band in 1998 at Pintos, an upscale bar at Allen Avenue in Ikeja owned by late Segun Onobolu. He started the band as a three piece band and the band has grown to be a fourteen piece live band.
On Friday 19 January 2018, Akin was unveiled as the Rotary International District 9110 Polio Ambassador. The event in which he dedicated his “I can Walk” song to polio survivors in Africa.
Some of the songs has to his credit are; I can walk, My Lady, You are Married today among others. He also has several awards and honours to his credit like the CityPeople Lifetime Achievement Awards 2017, and the Shuga Band Best Band of the Year 2016, 2017 Beatz Awards and many more.

References

Berklee College of Music alumni
Nigerian singer-songwriters
1975 births
Living people
21st-century Nigerian singers